Crematogaster betapicalis is a species of ant in tribe Crematogastrini. It was described by Smith in 1995.

References

betapicalis
Insects described in 1995